Whoop-Up Days is an annual non-profit festival, exhibition and rodeo held in Lethbridge, Alberta, for five days in the last full week of August.

The event includes a 4-km parade through downtown, daily concerts, bull riding, a rodeo, an indoor and outdoor trade show, entertainment on the free stage, a midway, HobbyWorld and citywide pancake breakfasts. In 2007, a record-breaking attendance at the event numbered 69,964. The previous record was set in 2006 when 67,590 visitors attended.

Economic impact from the fair amounts to roughly $2.5 million spent by event operations, locals and 13,000 visitors.

Location
Whoop-Up Days takes place at the Exhibition Park, which is on the eastern edge of the city. Permanent structures at the site include a 10,664 m2 (114,787 ft²) pavilion complex (main, north, west and south pavilions, and Saddle Room), Heritage Hall, Pioneer Park, a grandstand, and a racetrack.

History
The first fair was held on 5 October 1897 at the agricultural grounds in Queen Victoria Park (renamed in 1955 to Gyro Park). It included stage presentations, traveling shows and horse racing.

In 1904, eight years before the Calgary Stampede, the first large-scale rodeo was staged as part of Whoop-Up Days.

In 1912, the festival was moved to its current location east of Henderson Park.

There were cancellations in 1917–18 & 1942–45. 2020 saw a virtual event.

See also
  
Whoop-Up Trail
List of festivals in Lethbridge
List of festivals in Canada#Fairs and exhibitions

References

External links
Whoop-Up Days

August events
Festivals in Lethbridge
Festivals established in 1897
Fairs in Alberta
1897 establishments in Alberta
Whoop-Up Trail